 

The Baling River Bridge (Balinghe Bridge) is a suspension bridge in Guanling County in Guizhou Province of China. The bridge spans the Baling River Valley and opened to public traffic on December 23, 2009. The bridge is part of the G60 Shanghai–Kunming Expressway between Kunming and Guiyang and reduced the travel time across the river valley from one hour to four minutes.

Gallery

See also
Bailang River Bridge Ferris Wheel, a giant wheel on a similarly-named bridge in Weifang, Shandong, China
 List of bridges in China
 List of longest suspension bridge spans
 List of highest bridges in the world

References

External links

 on HighestBridges.com

Bridges in Guizhou
Suspension bridges in China
Bridges completed in 2009